The men's 800 metres event at the 1996 Summer Olympics in Atlanta, Georgia was held between 28 and 31 July 1996. There were a total of 57 competitors from 40 countries. The maximum number of athletes per nation had been set at 3 since the 1930 Olympic Congress. The event was won by Vebjørn Rodal of Norway, the nation's first title in the men's 800 metres and first medal in the event since 1956. Hezekiél Sepeng's silver was South Africa's first 800 metres medal since 1920.

Background

This was the 23rd appearance of the event, which is one of 12 athletics events to have been held at every Summer Olympics. Four finalists from 1992 returned: bronze medalist Johnny Gray of the United States (also a finalist in 1984 and 1988), fourth-place finisher José Luiz Barbosa of Brazil (a 1988 finalist as well), fifth-place finisher Andrea Benvenuti of Italy, and sixth-place finisher Curtis Robb of Great Britain. Wilson Kipketer was the strongest 800 metres runner in 1996, having won the first of his three world championship titles in 1995; however, he was ruled ineligible for the Games during the process of changing his nationality from Kenya to Denmark. Without Kipketer, the field was open with no clear favorite.

Burundi, the Czech Republic, Dominica, Guinea-Bissau, Kyrgyzstan, and Latvia appeared in the event for the first time. Great Britain made its 22nd appearance, most among all nations, having had no competitors in the event only in the 1904 Games in St. Louis.

Competition format

The men's 800 metres again used a three-round format, the most common format since 1912 though there had been variations. The "fastest loser" system introduced in 1964 was used for the first two rounds. There were eight first-round heats, each with 7 or 8 athletes; the top two runners in each heat as well as the next eight fastest overall advanced to the semifinals. There were three semifinals with 8 athletes each; the top two runners in each semifinal and the next two fastest overall advanced to the eight-man final.

Records

Prior to the competition, the existing World and Olympic records were as follows.

In the final Vebjørn Rodal set a new Olympic record at 1:42.58.

Schedule

All times are Eastern Daylight Time (UTC-4)

Results

Round 1

Heat 1

Heat 2

Heat 3

Heat 4

Heat 5

Heat 6

Heat 7

Heat 8

Overall results for round 1

Semifinals

Semifinal 1

Semifinal 2

Semifinal 3

Overall results for semifinals

Final

See also
Women's 800 metres

References

External links
 Official Report
 Results

8
800 metres at the Olympics
Men's events at the 1996 Summer Olympics